The 1983 NCAA Division I-A football season ended with the University of Miami, led by Bernie Kosar, winning their first national championship over perennial power and top ranked Nebraska in the Orange Bowl.

The Hurricanes' 31–30 win over Nebraska is still talked about as one of the greatest games of all time, not only for its last minute finish, but for its role in changing the face of college football. Miami came into the game ranked No. 5, but losses by No. 2 Texas in the Cotton Bowl and No. 4 Illinois in the Rose Bowl launched them to No. 1 (despite protests from No. 3 Auburn, who played the toughest schedule in the nation that year).

Nebraska scored a touchdown with 48 seconds remaining, putting them within one point of the Hurricanes.  Despite knowing a tie would still give Nebraska the national title, Coach Tom Osborne decided to go for two points and the win rather than one point and the tie.  Miami was able to hold, snapping Nebraska's 22-game winning streak and launching Miami as a powerhouse program.

This Miami team was the first to win a national title without a single player voted to the first team All-Americans and only the second to win a national title gaining more passing yards than rushing.

The Auburn Tigers, featuring Bo Jackson also had a stellar season going 11–1 and beating Michigan in the Sugar Bowl 9–7. Despite entering the bowl games ranked third in both major polls, and with both teams ranked higher losing their bowl games, the Tigers ended ranked third in the final AP poll as Miami jumped from 5th to ranked No. 1 when they beat No. 1 ranked Nebraska to gain the National Championship. Auburn had played the toughest schedule in the nation, including eight bowl teams, seven of which were ranked in the top 20 (four in the top ten). Even with this difficult schedule the Tigers were ranked first by a few polls, including The New York Times computer rankings. The NCAA record book also formally recognizes the Tigers as co-national champions, along with Nebraska (and Miami). It is not uncommon for the NCAA record book to "recognize" multiple national champions in a given year, with the AP and Coaches' poll winner regarded as national champions.

The Holiday Bowl was also a classic, as Brigham Young University, led by future NFL star Steve Young, defeated Missouri with a last second halfback pass.

This season's edition of the annual rivalry game between Oregon and Oregon State is still widely known and derided as "The Toilet Bowl", as the teams played to a 0–0 tie, the last scoreless tie in college football. The game featured 11 total turnovers, as 6 fumbles were lost (out of 11 total), 5 interceptions, and 4 missed field goals.

This season saw no conference have two or more teams tie for the title—an event that did not happen again in either Division I-A or its successor, Division I FBS, until 2009. (Note, however, that even when a conference officially recognizes multiple champions, it will invariably have some kind of tiebreaker system to determine placement for bowl berths.)

Rule changes
The winner of the pre-game coin toss now has the option to defer their choice to the second half.
Roughing the passer now includes an automatic first down in addition to yardage penalties.
Running into the kicker is now a foul, with a five-yard penalty assessed.
Unsportsmanlike conduct will be called against a kicker or punter who feigns being roughed to draw a penalty.
Unsportsmanlike conduct will also be called for taunting a defender with the ball, spiking the ball, etc. against a player or if an entire team runs onto the field to celebrate a score.
A two-yard buffer (halo) is established around a kick/punt returner when the ball begins its downward flight.
Conferences are permitted to add a seventh official (side judge) to their crews.  The Big Ten Conference is the first to establish seven-man crews.
Extended the "team area" from 30-yard line to 25-yard line.
Penalties that occur at the end of any quarter will cause the period to be extended for one un-timed down.
The visiting team must wear white jerseys. This rule change mostly affected Georgia Tech and LSU, which traditionally wore white at home.

Conference and program changes
 Admitted as a non-football member of the Atlantic Coast Conference in 1979, Georgia Tech played its first season of ACC football in 1983 after 19 seasons as an independent.

September
Big 8 rivals Nebraska and Oklahoma were No. 1 and No. 2 in the preseason AP Poll, followed by No. 3 Texas. Defending champion Penn State was No. 4, and Auburn was No. 5.

In the kickoff classic on August 29, No. 1 Nebraska routed No. 4 Penn State, 44-6. The Nittany Lions opened with three straight losses and never made it back into the polls. None of the other top-ranked teams played in the first week of September, and the next poll featured No. 1 Nebraska, No. 2 Oklahoma, No. 3 Texas, No. 4 Auburn, and No. 5 Notre Dame.

September 10: No. 1 Nebraska beat Wyoming 56-20, and No. 2 Oklahoma won 27-14 at Stanford. No. 3 Texas still had not started its schedule. No. 4 Auburn defeated Southern Mississippi 24-3, and No. 5 Notre Dame won 52-6 at Purdue. The latter two teams switched places in the next poll: No. 1 Nebraska, No. 2 Oklahoma, No. 3 Texas, No. 4 Notre Dame, and No. 5 Auburn.

September 17: No. 1 Nebraska annihilated Minnesota 84-13, setting a school scoring record against a Division I opponent. Otherwise, this was a day of shakeup in the top five. No. 2 Oklahoma lost at home to No. 6 Ohio State, 24-12. No. 3 Texas won at No. 4 Auburn 20-7. No. 5 Notre Dame lost at home to Michigan State, 28-23. Moving up in the next poll were No. 7 Arizona, which beat Washington State 45-6 (the Wildcats had outscored their first three opponents 133-12) and No. 10 North Carolina, which defeated Miami-Ohio 48-17. The poll featured No. 1 Nebraska, No. 2 Texas, No. 3 Ohio State, No. 4 Arizona, and No. 5 North Carolina. 

September 24: No. 1 Nebraska defeated UCLA 42-10, and No. 2 Texas beat North Texas State 26-6. No. 3 Ohio State lost at No. 7 Iowa 20-14, while No. 4 Arizona won 27-10 over Cal State Fullerton and No. 5 North Carolina beat William & Mary 51-20. The next poll featured No. 1 Nebraska, No. 2 Texas, No. 3 Arizona, No. 4 Iowa, and No. 5 North Carolina.

October
October 1: No. 1 Nebraska blew out Syracuse 63-7, and No. 2 Texas defeated Rice 42-6. However, No. 3 Arizona was tied by California 33-33; No. 4 Iowa had the same level of defense but none of the offense, being shut out 33-0 by Illinois. No. 5 North Carolina won 38-21 at Georgia Tech, which was beginning its first year in the ACC. Moving up were No. 6 Alabama, which had started 4-0 in their first year without Bear Bryant (the most recent win being 44-13 over Memphis) and No. 7 West Virginia, which edged Pittsburgh 24-21. The poll featured No. 1 Nebraska, No. 2 Texas, No. 3 Alabama, No. 4 North Carolina, and No. 5 West Virginia.

October 8: No. 1 Nebraska finally ran into trouble, being taken down to the wire in their Big 8 opener against Oklahoma State. The Cornhuskers pulled out a 14-10 win with an interception in the end zone on the game’s final play. No. 2 Texas matched up with Nebraska’s conference rival, No. 8 Oklahoma, and won 28-16. No. 3 Alabama lost at Penn State, 34-28. No. 4 North Carolina beat Wake Forest 30-10, No. 5 West Virginia was idle, and No. 7 Auburn won 49-21 at Kentucky. The next poll featured No. 1 Nebraska, No. 2 Texas, No. 3 North Carolina, No. 4 West Virginia, and No. 5 Auburn.

October 15: No. 1 Nebraska breathed a little easier with a 34-13 win at Missouri. No. 2 Texas beat Arkansas 31-3, No. 3 North Carolina won 42-14 at North Carolina State, No. 4 West Virginia shut out Virginia Tech 13-0, and No. 5 Auburn defeated Georgia Tech 31-13. The top five remained the same.

October 22: No. 1 Nebraska led by just two points at the half but exploded after the break, scoring 48 third-quarter points in a 69-19 rout of Colorado. No. 2 Texas beat No. 9 SMU 15-12, ending a 21-game unbeaten streak for the Mustangs. No. 3 North Carolina was idle. No. 4 West Virginia lost 41-23 at Penn State. No. 5 Auburn defeated Mississippi State 28-13, and No. 6 Florida won 24-17 over East Carolina. The next poll featured No. 1 Nebraska, No. 2 Texas, No. 3 North Carolina, No. 4 Auburn, and No. 5 Florida.
 
October 29: No. 1 Nebraska won 51-25 at Kansas State, and No. 2 Texas defeated Texas Tech 20-3. No. 3 North Carolina started a three-game losing streak by falling to No. 13 Maryland 28-26. No. 4 Auburn beat No. 5 Florida 28-21. Another SEC team, No. 6 Georgia, won 31-14 over Temple, while No. 7 Miami (which had won eight straight games by double digits after a season-opening loss to Florida) beat No. 12 West Virginia 20-3. The new top five was No. 1 Nebraska, No. 2 Texas, No. 3 Auburn, No. 4 Georgia, and No. 5 Miami.

November
November 5: No. 1 Nebraska put on another offensive clinic, winning 72-29 over Iowa State; Mike Rozier rushed for four touchdowns to set a new Big 8 record for TDs in a season. Meanwhile, No. 2 Texas was held without a touchdown but still beat Houston 9-3. No. 3 Auburn defeated No. 7 Maryland 35-23. No. 4 Georgia visited No. 9 Florida and dealt the Gators their second straight close loss, 10-9. No. 5 Miami needed a late touchdown to beat East Carolina 12-7; they were passed in the next poll by No. 6 Illinois, which won 50-23 at Minnesota. The top five were No. 1 Nebraska, No. 2 Texas, No. 3 Auburn, No. 4 Georgia, and No. 5 Illinois.

November 12: No. 1 Nebraska posted their fourth consecutive 50+ point performance, defeating Kansas 67-13. No. 2 Texas beat TCU 20-14. In a battle for first place in the SEC, No. 3 Auburn pulled out a 13-7 win over No. 4 Georgia, the Bulldogs’ first conference loss in four years. No. 5 Illinois beat Indiana 49-21 to clinch a surprise Big Ten title and Rose Bowl berth. No. 6 Miami finished its schedule with a 17-16 win at Florida State on a late field goal. The next poll featured No. 1 Nebraska, No. 2 Texas, No. 3 Auburn, No. 4 Illinois, and No. 5 Miami.

November 19: No. 1 Nebraska and No. 3 Auburn were idle. No. 2 Texas clinched the SWC title and a Cotton Bowl berth with a 24-21 win over Baylor. No. 4 Illinois finished its schedule by defeating Northwestern 56-24. The Illini’s Rose Bowl opponent would be UCLA, which earned the Pac-10 title with a 27-17 victory at USC. (In less dignified Pac-10 action, this was also the day of “The Toilet Bowl”, a 0-0 tie between Oregon and Oregon State which is regarded as one of the worst-played football games of all time.) No. 5 Miami had finished its season, and the top five remained the same.

November 26: Despite the season-long dominance of No. 1 Nebraska, unranked Oklahoma only had one conference loss and could still gain an Orange Bowl berth by defeating the Cornhuskers. Trailing by only seven points with under a minute left, the Sooners got as far as the Nebraska 1-yard line before a Cornhuskers defensive stand preserved a 28-21 victory. No. 2 Texas had an easier time, winning 45-13 at Texas A&M. No. 3 Auburn was again idle, and the top five remained the same.

December
December 3: Similar to Nebraska’s situation the previous week, No. 3 Auburn was undefeated in SEC play but No. 19 Alabama could keep their rivals out of the Sugar Bowl with a victory in their game against each other. The Tigers prevailed 23-20 in a torrential rainstorm, with the key play being a 71-yard touchdown run by Bo Jackson. All of the other highly-ranked teams had finished their seasons, and the top five was the same as the past few weeks: No. 1 Nebraska, No. 2 Texas, No. 3 Auburn, No. 4 Illinois, and No. 5 Miami.

Because the winners of major conferences were tied to specific bowls, none of the top four teams were able to play each other in the postseason. The highest-ranked matchup would be No. 1 Nebraska against No. 5 Miami in the Orange Bowl. No. 7 Georgia and No. 8 Michigan, the runners-up in the SEC and Big Ten, would respectively play No. 2 Texas in the Cotton Bowl and No. 3 Auburn in the Sugar Bowl. As always, the Rose Bowl would feature the winners of the Big Ten and Pac-10, No. 4 Illinois and unranked UCLA.

Conference standings

AP final poll

 Miami (FL)
 Nebraska
 Auburn
 Georgia
 Texas
 Florida
 Brigham Young
 Michigan 
 Ohio State 
 Illinois
 Clemson
 SMU
 Air Force
 Iowa
 Alabama
 West Virginia
 UCLA
 Pittsburgh
 Boston College
 East Carolina

Final coaches poll
 Miami (FL)
 Nebraska
 Auburn
 Georgia
 Texas
 Florida
 Brigham Young
 Ohio St.
 Michigan
 Illinois
 Southern Methodist
 Alabama
 UCLA
 Iowa
 Air Force
 West Virginia
 Penn St.
 Oklahoma St.
 Pittsburgh
 Boston College

Notable rivalry games
Arizona 17, Arizona State 15
Auburn 23, Alabama 20
Florida 53, Florida State 15
Florida 28, Miami 3
Georgia 10, Florida 9
Georgia 27, Georgia Tech 24
Iowa 51, Iowa State 10
Kansas 37, Missouri 27
LSU 20, Tulane 7
Miami 17, Florida State 16
Michigan 24, Ohio State 21
Michigan 42, Michigan State 0
Ole Miss 24, Mississippi State 23 (The "Immaculate Deflection"—a game-winning 26-yard field goal attempt by the Bulldogs' Arite Cosby was captured by a strong gust of wind and blown straight down to the ground five yards short of the goalpost, allowing the Rebels to win the Egg Bowl and qualify for a bowl game)
Navy 42, Army 13
Nebraska 28, Oklahoma 21
Notre Dame 27, USC 6
Oklahoma 21, Oklahoma State 20
Oregon 0, Oregon State 0 (Known as The Toilet Bowl, the last time an NCAA Division I-A game ended in a scoreless tie.)
Texas 28, Oklahoma 16
 Texas 45, Texas A&M 13
UCLA 27, USC 17
Washington State 17, Washington 6
Wisconsin 56, Minnesota 17
 California 27, Stanford 18

No. 1 and No. 2 Progress
In the AP preseason poll released on August 27, Big 8 Conference rivals Nebraska and Oklahoma were No. 1 and No. 2.  After the Oklahoma Sooners lost 24–14 to Ohio State on September 17, the Nebraska Cornhuskers remained No. 1 and were trailed for nearly the entire season by Texas.   Nebraska received all 60 of the first place votes in the polls of September 26 and October 3, and no fewer than 51 as the season continued, while the Longhorns never received more than five votes during the same period.  Meanwhile, the University of Miami Hurricanes, unranked in the preseason Top 20, began winning after their first week 28–3 loss to Florida.  Miami came in at No. 15 in the September 26 poll.  As they continued unbeaten, the Hurricanes gathered force, rising to No. 12, No. 10, No. 8, No. 7, and reached No. 5 by October 31, where they remained in the final regular season poll after they were invited to play against Nebraska in the Orange Bowl.

Bowl games

Rose Bowl: UCLA 45, No. 4 Illinois 9
Sugar Bowl: No. 3 Auburn 9, No. 8 Michigan 7
Orange Bowl: No. 5 Miami (Fl) 31, No. 1 Nebraska 30
Cotton Bowl: No. 7 Georgia 10, No. 2 Texas 9

Other Bowls:
Fiesta Bowl: No. 14 Ohio State 28, No. 15 Pittsburgh 23
Florida Citrus Bowl: Tennessee 30, No. 17 Maryland 23
Gator Bowl: No. 11 Florida 14, No. 10 Iowa 6
Holiday Bowl: No. 9 Brigham Young 21, Missouri 17
Peach Bowl: Florida State 28, North Carolina 3
Sun Bowl:  Alabama 28, No. 6 SMU 7
Independence Bowl: No. 16 Air Force 9, Ole Miss 3
Liberty Bowl: Notre Dame 19, No. 13 Boston College 18
Aloha Bowl: Penn State 13, Washington 10
Bluebonnet Bowl Oklahoma State 24, No. 20 Baylor 14
Hall of Fame Classic: No. 18 West Virginia 20, Kentucky 16
California Bowl: Northern Illinois 20, CSU-Fullerton 13

Heisman Trophy voting
The Heisman Trophy is given to the year's most outstanding player

Other annual awards
Maxwell Award (College Player of the Year) – Mike Rozier, Nebraska
Walter Camp Award (Back) – Mike Rozier, Nebraska
Davey O'Brien Award (Quarterback) – Steve Young, Brigham Young
Lombardi Award (Lineman or Linebacker) – Dean Steinkuhler, Nebraska
Outland Trophy (Interior Lineman) – Dean Steinkuhler, Offensive tackle,  Nebraska
Paul "Bear" Bryant Award – Howard Schnellenberger, Miami

References